The 2005 World Allround Speed Skating Championships were held in the indoor arena in Moscow, Russia, on 5 and 6 February 2005.

German Anni Friesinger and American Shani Davis became the world champions.

Men's championships

Allround results 

NQ = Not qualified for the 10000 m (only the best 12 are qualified)DQ = disqualifiedNS = Not started

Women's championships

Allround results 

NQ = Not qualified for the 5000 m (only the best 12 are qualified)DQ = disqualified

Rules 
All 24 participating skaters are allowed to skate the first three distances; 12 skaters may take part on the fourth distance. These 12 skaters are determined by taking the standings on the longest of the first three distances, as well as the samalog standings after three distances, and comparing these lists as follows:

 Skaters among the top 12 on both lists are qualified.
 To make up a total of 12, skaters are then added in order of their best rank on either list. Samalog standings take precedence over the longest-distance standings in the event of a tie.

References
Results on IsuResults.eu

World Allround Speed Skating Championships, 2005
2005 World Allround
World Allround, 2005
Sports competitions in Moscow